Rebecca Anderson (born 15 November 1967) is a British journalist, and the anchor of CNN International's flagship news and current affairs primetime news program Connect the World. She previously hosted Business International.

Life
Anderson was born in England. She holds a bachelor's degree in Economics and French from the University of Sussex, and a master's degree in Mass Communication from Arizona State University.

She worked for Bloomberg, CNBC, and joined CNN in 1999.

Staged protest allegations
Anderson drew criticism after an incident involving the 2017 London Bridge attack where she was accused of staging an event showing Muslims demonstrating to show sympathy to the victims of the attack. However, CNN strongly denied the allegation. "This story is nonsense," CNN said in a statement. "The group of demonstrators that was at the police cordon was being allowed through by officers so they could show their signs to the gathered media. The CNN crew along with other media present simply filmed them doing so."

References

External links
Becky Anderson profile at CNN.com

Living people
1967 births
Journalists from Manchester
Alumni of the University of Sussex
Walter Cronkite School of Journalism and Mass Communication alumni
English television journalists
English women journalists
CNN people
English expatriates in the United States
British women television journalists